Club Champagnat is an Argentine sports club headquartered in Buenos Aires, with its facilities and field in Barrio Champagnat of Pilar.

Champagnat is mostly known for its rugby union team, which currently plays in the Primera A, the second division of the URBA league system. Other sports practised at Champagnat are association football and field hockey.

History
In 1954, Angel Diez, then professor of Colegio Champagnat, along with other religious from the congregation, registered the rugby team of the college at the "River Plate Rugby Union" (nowadays Argentine Rugby Union) to play its tournaments.

The club began to play at sixth division with a team formed exclusively by pupils of the school. On November 30, 1956, Club Champagnat was officially established, being Lino Landajo the first president. The club had nine competitive teams by then.

The club hosted all of its activities at the Champagnat College field, placed in General San Martín Partido of Greater Buenos Aires. In 1958 the rugby union team won the third division championship, therefore promoting to second division, where it played until 1970. Due to a restructure of the leagues, Champagnat started the 1971 season in the first division. One year later, the club moved to Malvinas Argentinas Partido, where rugby union, field hockey, paddle tennis and tennis courts were built, apart from a swimming pool. In 1982 the women's field hockey section was opened, primarily with the purpose of being an entertainment for its members' daughters due to the club did not have an activity specifically for women.

That same year the hockey team played its first official game against Colegio de la Santa Unión, then playing other schools of the region. The team also toured some Argentine provinces, and then travelled outside the country, having toured on Uruguay (in 2005) and South Africa (in 2009).

The rugby team was relegated to second division in 1981, promoted to the top level in 1983, although it was sent back to the second division in 1984. In 1993 the team won again the second division tournament, remaining since then in the first division (Grupo I).

The hockey team registered to the Association in 2001, making its debut against Club Ciudad de Buenos Aires. The team won the game by 4-0 and would later win the championship, remaining undefeated at the end of the season.

References

External links
 Official site 
 Colegio Champagnat

c
c
C
c
c